The 2022–23 season is the 137th season in the existence of Plymouth Argyle Football Club and the club's third consecutive season in League One. In addition to the league, they also competed in the 2022–23 FA Cup, the 2022–23 EFL Cup and the 2022–23 EFL Trophy.

First-team squad

Statistics

|-
!colspan=15|Players out on loan:

|-
!colspan=15|Players who left the club during the season:

|}

Goals record

Disciplinary record

Transfers

In

Out

Loans in

Loans out

Pre-season and friendlies
Truro City announced a friendly match with Plymouth on 17 May 2022. Plymouth confirmed that match on 24 May, whilst also announcing matches with Plymouth Parkway, Bristol City and Yeovil Town. A day later, an away trip to Torquay United was added to the pre-season schedule. A sixth fixture was added to the calendar, against Swansea City.

Competitions

Overall record

League One

League table

Results summary

Results by round

Matches

On 23 June, the league fixtures were announced.

FA Cup

Plymouth were drawn away to Grimsby Town in the first round.

EFL Cup

Argyle were drawn at home to Peterborough United in the first round.

EFL Trophy

On 20 June, the initial Group stage draw was made, grouping Plymouth Argye with Bristol Rovers and Swindon Town. Three days later, Crystal Palace U21s joined Southern Group E. Argyle were then drawn at home to Charlton Athletic in the second round and against AFC Wimbledon in the third round. In the semi-finals, Argyle were drawn at home versus Cheltenham Town.

References

Plymouth Argyle
Plymouth Argyle F.C. seasons